Mamadouba Resmu Camara nicknamed Maxime Camara (4 February 1945 – 29 March 2016) was a Guinea international football midfielder.

Career
Born in Kissidougou, Camara played club football for local side Hafia F.C. in the 1960s and 1970s. He helped the club win the 1972 African Cup of Champions Clubs.

Camara represented Guinea at the 1968 Summer Olympics in Mexico City. He also made several appearances for the senior Guinea national football team, including four FIFA World Cup qualifying matches, and played at the 1976 African Cup of Nations finals.

Personal

On 24 April 1974 he married Aminata Touré, the daughter of the Guinean President Ahmed Sekou Touré.
They have 4 children.

Camara became seriously ill while living in Guinea in 2005. He was then evacuated to Morocco where he died on 29 March 2016.

References

External links

Biography at Sports-reference.com

1943 births
2016 deaths
Sportspeople from Conakry
Guinean footballers
Guinea international footballers
Olympic footballers of Guinea
Footballers at the 1968 Summer Olympics
1976 African Cup of Nations players
Hafia FC players
Association football midfielders